23131 Debenedictis, provisional designation , is a bright background asteroid from the inner region of the asteroid belt, approximately 4 kilometers in diameter. It was discovered on 5 January 2000, by astronomers of the LINEAR program at the Lincoln Laboratory's Experimental Test Site near Socorro, New Mexico, United States. The asteroid was named for 2007-ISEF awardee Erika Alden DeBenedictis.

Orbit and classification 

Debenedictis is a non-family from the main belt's background population. It orbits the Sun in the inner asteroid belt at a distance of 1.9–2.6 AU once every 3 years and 4 months (1,220 days; semi-major axis of 2.23 AU). Its orbit has an eccentricity of 0.17 and an inclination of 2° with respect to the ecliptic.

Physical characteristics 

Based on the asteroid's geometric albedo of 0.249, it is possibly a stony S-type asteroid.

Rotation period 

As of 2018, no rotational lightcurve of Debenedictis has been obtained from photometric observations. The body's rotation period, pole and shape remain unknown.

Diameter and albedo 

According to the survey carried out by the NEOWISE mission of NASA's Wide-field Infrared Survey Explorer, Debenedictis measures 3.853 kilometers in diameter and its surface has an albedo of 0.249.

Naming 

This minor planet was named after American 2007-ISEF awardee Erika Alden DeBenedictis (born 1992) for her computer science project. She attended the Saint Pius X High School, Albuquerque, New Mexico, United States. The official naming citation was published by the Minor Planet Center on 28 August 2007.

In 2008, she further became connected to asteroids when she attended the Summer Science Program, which teaches astronomy through a curriculum based on asteroid observations and orbital calculations. At the program in Socorro, New Mexico, just a short distance from where the asteroid was discovered, she had the opportunity to observe her namesake.

References

External links 
 Images of (23131) Debenedictis, Texas A&M University Department of Physics and Astronomy
 Asteroid Lightcurve Database (LCDB), query form (info )
 Dictionary of Minor Planet Names, Google books
 Asteroids and comets rotation curves, CdR – Observatoire de Genève, Raoul Behrend
 Discovery Circumstances: Numbered Minor Planets (20001)-(25000) – Minor Planet Center
 
 

023131
023131
Named minor planets
Summer Science Program
20000105